Kuytuca is a village in Göle District of Ardahan Province, Turkey. Its population is 729 (2021). The village was founded by seven families from Ahıska (now Akhaltsikhe, a city in Georgia) in the early years of the 19th century. It was captured by Russia during the Russo-Turkish War (1877–1878). It was returned to Turkey after the First World War.

References

Villages in Göle District